Oranjeville is a small town situated on the banks of the Wilge River in the Free State province of South Africa.

It takes its name from the Orange Free State, Oranje-Vrystaat in Afrikaans.

It was established as a stop-over for wagoners travelling between Heilbron, Frankfort and Vereeniging. It was named after the Prince of Orange of the Netherlands. The main road passing through the town is the R716 road, called Malan Street in Oranjeville.

References

Populated places in the Metsimaholo Local Municipality